Mariam Sidibé is an Ivorian footballer who plays for the Ivory Coast women's national team.

Club career
Sidibé has played in her country for Juventus de Yopougon.

International career
Sidibé capped for Ivory Coast at senior level during the 2019 WAFU Zone B Women's Cup.

See also
List of Ivory Coast women's international footballers

References

Year of birth missing (living people)
Living people
Ivorian women's footballers
Ivory Coast women's international footballers
Women's association footballers not categorized by position